Helmuth Räästas (born 20 January 1903, date of death unknown) was an Estonian footballer. He played in 20 matches for the Estonia national football team from 1926 to 1937. He was also named in Estonia's squad for the Group 1 qualification tournament for the 1938 FIFA World Cup.

Räästas' whereabouts after 1945 are unknown.

References

1903 births
Year of death missing
Estonian footballers
Estonia international footballers
Place of birth missing
Association football midfielders
JK Tallinna Kalev players
Footballers from Tallinn